The 1834 Dutch Reformed Church split, or the Secession of 1834, known simply as Afscheiding ("separation, secession, split"),  refers to a split that occurred within the Dutch Reformed Church in 1834. The federation of churches resulting from this split, the Christelijke Gereformeerde Kerken (CGK) (translated to the Christian Reform Church) still exists in the Netherlands today.  The Free Reformed Churches are the North American counterpart.

Leading up to Secession 
The Secession of 1834 began in Ulrum, a town in the north of the Dutch province of Groningen. Leading up to the secession, their pastor, reverend Hendrik de Cock was forbidden by the government to preach and ordered not to warn people against what he believed to be the erroneous teachings of some of his colleagues. Hendrik, along with other ministers, publicly opposed and denied some of the heresies that were being tolerated by the churches. They also rejected the introduction of manmade hymns into worship in place of the use of the Psalms. He was also forbidden to baptize the children of believers who refused to have their children baptized by their own ministers who they believed were not sound in the faith. The people that decided to leave had a very hard time at the beginning. Some people were fined, some were jailed.

Outcome 
Therefore, on 14 October 1834, a large majority of the congregation of the Dutch Reformed Church in Ulrum, signed "The Act of Secession and Return", breaking away from the State Church. The Secession would play a role in the 1857 Dutch Reformed Church split between the Reformed Church in America and the Christian Reformed Church in North America in 1857. There were three major principles that went along with the split: 1. They withdrew from the church "false", 2. gave loyalty to the three reforms and the "Order of Dort", and 3. wanted to make connections with other churches with the same values and beliefs. Various churches came and left the movement, but the ones that stayed united under the Christian reform church. They were not allowed to conjugate in groups larger than twenty people, and they were not able to get buildings or property to have churches built for their meetings. Here and there over time, they gained respect and were able to worship, but because of all these repercussions at the beginning, the act of praying before a church service derived from the meetings they would hold in secret. 

Many of those trying to secede were treated poorly, so they looked for a different way out to partake in their religion in peace. Some reformers decided it was time to move, so they migrated to America, some going to what is today known as New York and Michigan. In 1857 the Christian Reformed Church was finally created in Grand Rapids, Michigan. After more trouble and the leaders not accepting and wanting to preach certain aspects, they then formed the Christian Protestant church. These two denominations flourished when a spike in Dutch immigration occurred at the end of the second world war. From these two denominations, they then took full advantage of their freedom of religion in America, and created a series of denominations from the two, they could pick and choose the aspects they wanted to include in their religions and what they did not want to preach on, and sometimes it came down to being as simple as them being loyal to a certain leader or priest, so they followed them through the changes in denominations.

Abraham Kuyper 
Abraham Kuyper was a brilliant man from the years of the reformation of the Churches. He founded the Anti Revolutionary party after deciding he was converted by a Godly woman at one of his first congregations. In 1880 he became a very important and influential mover in the Free University of Amsterdam, which gave higher education to the Reformed. He shared some of the same views as Calvinism, but not he did not preach all aspects of Calvin's teachings. For one, he did not press the need for conversion, or being saved. He believed that children of believers were already saved unless they showed otherwise. That being said, he and his people did not see the need to be saved or partake in that practice unless they had reason to believe the person in question showed they were not converted. When they found  that the local church did not agree with his views, his people decided they needed to once again break from the church. When denied a chance to create an entirely new church and following, Kuyper and his people decided to find a way to unite his church with that of the local church.

See also

1857 Dutch Reformed Church split
1886 Dutch Reformed Church split

Footnotes 

Secession of 1834
1834 in the Netherlands
Schisms in Christianity
1834 in Christianity
History of Calvinism in the Netherlands